Corstorphine RFC is an Edinburgh rugby union club. Formed in 1950, the club represented the western Edinburgh suburb of Corstorphine. In 2017 the club was rebranded as Corstorphine Cougars.

History

The club was officially formed as Corstorphine RFC in 1950. They played in different variations of navy and red strips. Most often in red and blue quarter panels.

Rugby Union in Union Park, Corstorphine

Edinburgh University first used Union Park in the 1870s for sport.  Royal HSFP used the park for a short period before leaving Union Park to move to Jock's Lodge. The Corstorphine Amateur Association was formed in 1920 to use the sports grounds. The Association included athletics, cricket, hockey, football (soccer) and rugby for youths residing in the area.
The rugby club was disbanded along with the rest of the Athletics association in 1939 with the outbreak of the war.

Formation of Corstorphine RFC

Corstorphine RFC was formed from the ashes of the Amateur Association rugby club, after the 2nd world war in 1950. Former pre-war Association rugby union players Alex Watson and Jock Waugh persuaded John McLean and David Fell to recruit sufficient local players to form a 1st and 2nd XV to play in the Edinburgh District League for junior clubs.

During the 1950s, 1960s and 1970s the club prospered winning the aforementioned league on several occasions.  Full membership status to the Scottish Rugby Union was granted in 1973 with entry to the Division XI of the newly formed leagues.  At its peak 1st, 2nd, 3rd and 4th XV's along with a Codgers (over 35's) and a very large youth section played rugby on the hallowed turf at Union Park.

The club achieved high points playing SRU Premiership 2 rugby and SRU Shield semi final with a result coming down to the very last play of the game before being beaten by Duns RFC.  The club also made national news after defeating Premiership 1 side Kirkcaldy during a SRU cup run that was eventually ended in a hard-fought and close game against Premiership 2 side West of Scotland.

It also held the honour of holding the record for the longest running fixture between Scottish and Irish clubs having played against Suttonians RFC from 1955 through to the late 1990s.

Merger

The club was merged with Royal HSFP in 2003. The new club was Royal High Corstorphine. The original idea of the new club was that it would be based jointly at Barnton - Royal High FP's ground - and at Union Park - Corstorphine RFC's ground.

Dissolve of the merger

As time went by 1st team matches were played at Barnton, with 2nd XV games at Union Park.  With some of the then 1st team refusing to help support both grounds by playing a few games at Union Park it unearthed some fundamental differences in opinion on how a club should be run and funded. This caused friction between both Corstorphine and Royal High factions. The Royal High faction secretly moved to reform their own club in 2017, which forced RHC from the facilities at the school.  This came at a cost as RHC were not in a position to compete in the National Leagues, opting instead to drop back to the East Region.  League rules also meant 'Royal High' began as 'Barnton RFC' before the name was relinquished (Corstorphine retained the name Royal High Corstorphine for legal reasons until the 2018/19 season) Barnton also lost its league position in the National Leagues and was forced into the bottom regional league and became an associate member club.  Corstorphine RFC remain as a full member club of the SRU.

Corstophine Cougars

RHC was re-branded as the Corstorphine Cougars in 2017. It runs two men's sides who play in the East Region leagues, a women's side who play in the Premiership and Have recently started a women's development side.  The club has re-established its minis section and are currently working in partnership with Forester RFC on Youth rugby in the area which is currently operating as Wolves Rugby

Honours

Peebles Sevens
 Champions (1): 1996
 Musselburgh Sevens
 Champions: 1994

Tours
Two very notable achievements in terms of tours at Corstorphine.

As mentioned earlier Suttonians RFC was long the destination for the club tour.  The club holding the record for the longest running fixture between Scottish and Irish clubs having played against Suttonians RFC from 1955 through to the late 1990s. A link will be re-established in 2020 as the women's team take up the mantle of touring to Dublin.

In 1979 Corstorphine 3rd Team toured to the small Lake District town of Keswick RFC.  This tour has continued to this day with the 40th tour celebrated in 2018.  The two clubs play each year in April/May for the Corwick Trophy. This is possibly the longest running fixture between two Scottish and English Clubs.  This is yet to be verified.

References

Scottish rugby union teams
Rugby union in Edinburgh
Sports teams in Edinburgh
Corstorphine
Rugby clubs established in 1950
Rugby clubs established in 2017
Sports clubs disestablished in 2003
1950 establishments in Scotland
2003 disestablishments in Scotland
2017 establishments in Scotland